Luisa María Francisca de Guzmán y Sandoval (13 October 1613 – 27 February 1666) was  Queen of Portugal as the spouse of King John IV, the first Braganza ruler. She was the mother of two kings of Portugal (Afonso VI and Peter II) and a queen of England (Catherine of Braganza). She served as regent of Portugal de jure from 1656 until 1662, and de facto until her death in 1666.

Biography

Early life 
Luisa was Spanish by birth, the daughter of Manuel Pérez de Guzmán y Silva, 8th Duke of Medina Sidonia, and Juana Lorenza Gomez de Sandoval y de la Cerda. Her paternal grandfather was Alonso de Guzmán, "El Bueno", while her paternal great-grandmother was Ana de Mendoza y de Silva, Princess of Éboli.

She married a high ranking Portuguese noble, John, 8th Duke of Braganza, in 1633, during the period of the Iberian Union.

Restoration War
Despite her Spanish roots, Luisa guided her husband's policies during the Portuguese revolution against Habsburg Spain of 1640. She is considered the main influence behind his acceptance of the Portuguese throne when the Revolution seemed to tend to the Portuguese side. 
It is said that being warned of the dangers of becoming queen of a country that was to face Spain's might, she pronounced the famous words:

Antes Rainha um dia que Duquesa toda a vida.

Rather Queen for a day than Duchess all my life.

In some sources, this is quoted as for an hour instead of for a day.

When she was made aware of a failed attempt to murder the King in 1641, she is said to have been one of the members of the Corte, which supported the execution of nobles like the Duke of Caminha.

Regency

In 1656, she was named Regent of the Kingdom after her husband's death and during the minority of her son Afonso VI.  She continued to occupy the post even after Afonso became an adult in 1662, because her son was mentally unstable.  She was the target of a failed conspiracy headed by Luís de Vasconcelos e Sousa, Count of Castelo Melhor.

She defended the principles of freedom and independence of Portugal and controlled the government with a strong hand, fearing her eldest son was incapable and hoping that eventually her youngest son would take the crown.

Luisa was politically astute and mainly responsible for the diplomatic success of the new alliance with England. Her daughter Catherine married Charles II of England. She is also credited with the organization of the armies that in the following years would completely ensure Portuguese independence through the victories in the Portuguese Restoration War.

Issue

Infante Teodósio, Prince of Brazil (8 February 1634 – 13 May 1653) died unmarried. 
Ana of Braganza (21 January 1635) died at birth.
Infanta Joana, Princess of Beira (18 September 1635 – 17 November 1653) died unmarried.
Catherine of Braganza (25 November 1638 – 31 December 1705) married Charles II of England and had no surviving issue.
Manuel of Portugal (6 September 1640) died at birth.
Afonso VI of Portugal (21 August 1643 – 12 September 1683) married Maria Francisca of Savoy.
Pedro II of Portugal (26 April 1648 – 9 December 1706) married firstly Maria Francisca of Savoy, had issue; married secondly Maria Sophia of Neuburg, had issue.

Ancestry

References

External links 

1613 births
1666 deaths
People from Sanlúcar de Barrameda
Portuguese queens consort
17th-century Portuguese people
17th-century women rulers
Burials at the Monastery of São Vicente de Fora
House of Medina Sidonia
House of Braganza
Regents of Portugal
Luisa
Queen mothers
Royal reburials